Kajetanówka may refer to the following places:
Kajetanówka, Biłgoraj County in Lublin Voivodeship (east Poland)
Kajetanówka, Chełm County in Lublin Voivodeship (east Poland)
Kajetanówka, Kraśnik County in Lublin Voivodeship (east Poland)
Kajetanówka, Lublin County in Lublin Voivodeship (east Poland)
Kajetanówka, Łęczna County in Lublin Voivodeship (east Poland)